Comparative Education Review is the official publication of the Comparative and International Education Society. It publishes research that investigates education throughout the world and the social, economic, and political forces that shape it.

External links 
 Comparative Education Review homepage
 Comparative and International Education Society homepage

University of Chicago Press academic journals
Comparative education
Education journals
Quarterly journals
English-language journals
Publications established in 1957